The 2016–17 FIS Snowboard World Cup was 23rd multi race season in snowboarding. Competition consisted of the parallel slalom, parallel giant slalom, snowboard cross, halfpipe, slopestyle and big air.

Men

Parallel

Snowboard Cross

Big Air

Slopestyle

Halfpipe

Women

Parallel

Snowboard Cross

Big Air

Slopestyle

Halfpipe

Team

Snowboard cross men

Snowboard cross ladies

Parallel mixed

Men's standings

Parallel overall (PSL/PGS) 

Standings after 9 races.

Parallel slalom 

Standings after 3 races.

Parallel giant slalom 

Standings after 6 races.

Snowboard Cross 

Standings after 7 races.

Freestyle overall (BA/SBS/HP) 

Standings after 16 races.

Big Air 

Standings after 6 races.

Slopestyle 

Standings after 6 races.

Halfpipe 

Standings after 4 races.

FIS Super Series 

Standings after 3 races.

Ladies' standings

Parallel overall (PSL/PGS) 

Standings after 9 races.

Parallel slalom 

Standings after 3 races.

Parallel giant slalom 

Standings after 6 races.

Snowboard Cross 

Standings after 7 races.

Freestyle  overall (BA/SBS/HP) 

Standings after 16 races.

Big Air 

Standings after 6 races.

Slopestyle 

Standings after 6 races.

Halfpipe 

Standings after 4 races.

FIS Super Series 

Standings after 3 races.

Footnotes

References

FIS Snowboard World Cup
FIS Snowboard World Cup
FIS Snowboard World Cup
Snowboarding